Michael Francis McFarlane (25 October 1908 – 12 October 1981) was an Australian rules footballer who played with Essendon and North Melbourne in the Victorian Football League (VFL).

Notes

External links 

Mick McFarlane's profile at Australianfootball.com

1908 births
1981 deaths
Australian rules footballers from Victoria (Australia)
Essendon Football Club players
North Melbourne Football Club players
Coburg Football Club players
Euroa Football Club players